Sportradar AG is a multinational corporation with headquarters in St. Gallen, Switzerland, that collects and analyzes sports data for bookmakers, national and international sports federations, and media companies. As of 2022, the company has 35 offices in 19 countries around the world, including New York City, Las Vegas, London, Trondheim, Munich, Ljubljana, Sydney, and Singapore.

Through its subsidiary Sportradar US, Sportradar is the official data provider for NBA, MLB, NASCAR, ITF, NHL, FIFA, and UEFA. At the end of 2015, Sportradar renewed the partnership with the International Tennis Federation as their official data collection service partner. In 2016, Sportradar entered into a partnership with the NBA.

In January 2021, the company announced that former Fiserv CEO Jeff Yabuki as Sportradar's new chairman. In March 2021, Bloomberg News reported that Sportradar was in talks to go public via a SPAC, Horizon Acquisition Corp II.

History

Sportradar started as a software program that extracted betting odds from sports betting companies on the Internet. The program was developed by two Norwegians, Petter Fornass and Tore Steinkjer, who formed the company Market Monitor AS in 2001.
Carsten Koerl was a major investor, buying 51% of the company's stock.

In 2012, Sportradar merged with Kilka. That same year, private equity firm EQT invested in Sportradar. In 2013, Sportradar made several acquisitions, including Attainment GmbH and Venatrack Ltd.

In September 2014, Sportradar became a 40% shareholder of NSoft, a software company from Bosnia and Herzegovina that offers an omnichannel betting solution for betting and gambling operators. That same year, EQT's Expansion Capital Fund II reinvested in Sportradar by selling its minority stake in the company to its flagship fund, EQT VI.

In 2015, Sportradar obtained distribution rights for NASCAR, NFL, and NHL. The same year, Revolution LLC led investments in the company from Michael Jordan and Mark Cuban. NFL also acquired equity in Sportradar US as part of the partnership.

In 2016, Sportradar acquired Sportman Media Holding, including Laola1.  Later that year, the NBA announced a multi-year partnership with Sportradar involving integrity services, data distribution and video streaming.

Sports betting services

Through the brand Betradar, Sportradar provides bookmakers with several sports-betting services.

As of 2015, Sportradar has partnered with roughly 450 bookmakers including Bet365, William Hill, Paddy Power, and Ladbrokes. The Sportradar services are also used by state lotteries such as Veikkaus, Svenska Spel and Norsk Tipping.

Sportradar creates odds for thousands of games across 40 sports. The odds are created by feeding sports data collected by Sportradar into mathematical models. For in-game betting odds, this requires continuous recalculation of the outcomes using the live data that Sportradar collects or acquires through licenses. These odds are sold as odds suggestions to bookmakers, for matches for which the bookmakers are unable to create their own odds.

Sportradar will also use its integrity services to monitor betting on all NFL games and will have the right to distribute live audio-visual feeds of NFL games to sportsbooks in certain international markets.

Audio-visual, OTT, and broadcast services
In 2016, Sportradar agreed to a deal to acquire the shares and core business of media agency Sportsman Media Group.

They have worked with the World Rally Championship and Borussia Dortmund to deliver their B2C OTT platforms.

The K League signed a multi-year deal with Sportradar in late 2019, to extend its international broadcasting. This resulted in coverage reaching a record number of territories during the 2020 season.

Integrity services

Sportradar provides federations and law enforcement agencies with a system for detecting betting-related match fixing. These services are operated by Sportradar's Security Services division.

Initial services included an Early Warning System developed in 2005 following the Hoyzer scandal. The use of this system was one of the measures Bundeslinga took for preventing further match-fixing. Later versions included live monitoring, and was relaunched in 2009 as Fraud Detection System (FDS).

The development of FDS was done in cooperation with UEFA. Through this partnership, Sportradar monitors suspicious matches in the two top leagues of every UEFA member nation.

FDS has since then expanded its partnerships to other sports and federations, including Asian Football Confederation, CONCACAF, FIBA, ESL and IOC. Sportradar has also signed agreements with several law enforcement agencies, including Europol and the Australian Federal Police.

The Fraud Detection System works by comparing odds movement patterns from online bookmakers with the expected odds' movement patterns for a given match. When suspicious matches are found, they are analyzed and then reported to the relevant federation. The federation can then start their own investigations. As of 2016, the Fraud Detection System monitors more than 31,000 European football matches per year.

Since the launch of the Fraud Detection System, Sportradar has been involved in several match fixing cases, such as the Austrian case including Sanel Kuljić in 2013, the Australian case in 2013,, and the Nepal scandal in 2015,. The system has indicated that since 2009, more than 2,000 events have likely been manipulated.

Sportradar launched its Intelligence & Investigation Services (I&I) in 2013. In November 2020, Sportradar announced extending its I&I capabilities to specifically supporting more US clients.

Federation partnerships

Sportradar has partnered with several sports federations to collect or distribute sports data, including Handball-Bundesliga and the ITF.

In 2020, the Board of Control for Cricket in India (BCCI) partnered with Sportradar to support its Anti Corruption Unit (ACU) in monitoring all games that were played in the 2020 season of the India Premier League (IPL).

See also

 Genius Sports

References

Software companies established in 2000
Web service providers
Norwegian companies established in 2000
Companies based in St. Gallen (city)
Sports records and statistics
Sports mass media in Switzerland
Data companies
2021 initial public offerings
Companies listed on the Nasdaq